A drop shot is a type of shot in some racquet sports.

Drop shot or dropshot may also refer to:

 Drop Shot, a novel by Harlan Coben
 Dropshot (Transformers)
 Bomb shot, or drop shot, a type of mixed drink
 Operation Dropshot, or Dropshot, the code name for the United States contingency plans for a possible war with the Soviet Union

See also
 Dropshotting